The 57th Writers Guild of America Awards, given on February 19, 2005, honored the film and television best writers of 2004.

Winners and nominees

Film

Adapted Screenplay
 Sideways - Alexander Payne and Jim Taylor
Before Sunset - Richard Linklater, Julie Delpy, Ethan Hawke and Kim Krizan
Mean Girls - Tina Fey
Million Dollar Baby - Paul Haggis
The Motorcycle Diaries (Diarios de motocicleta) - José Rivera

Original Screenplay
 Eternal Sunshine of the Spotless Mind - Pierre Bismuth, Michel Gondry and Charlie Kaufman
The Aviator - John Logan
Garden State - Zach Braff
Hotel Rwanda - Keir Pearson and Terry George
Kinsey - Bill Condon

Documentary Screenplay
 Super Size Me - Morgan Spurlock
Bright Leaves - Ross McElwee
Control Room - Julia Bacha and Jehane Noujaim
Home of the Brave - Paola di Florio
The Hunting of the President - Harry Thomason and Nickolas Perry
In the Realms of the Unreal - Jessica Yu

Television

Best Episodic Drama
"The Supremes" - The West Wing - Debora Cahn
"Falling Into Place" - Six Feet Under - Craig Wright
"Long Term Parking" - The Sopranos - Terence Winter
"Memorial Day" - The West Wing - John Sacret Young and Josh Singer

Best Episodic Comedy
"Pier Pressure" - Arrested Development - James Vallely and Mitch Hurwitz
"Ida's Boyfriend" - Malcolm in the Middle - Neil Thompson
"Splat!" - Sex and the City - Jenny Bicks and Cindy Chupack
"The Ick Factor" - Sex and the City - Julie Rottenberg and Elisa Zuritsky
"Pilot" - Wonderfalls - Bryan Fuller and Todd Holland

Best Animation Screenplay:
The Simpsons - "Catch 'Em If You Can"
Best Daytime Serial:
The Guiding Light

References
WGA - Previous award winners

2004
2004 film awards
2004 guild awards
2004 television awards
Writ
2004 in American cinema
2004 in American television
February 2005 events in the United States